The Asian Marathon Championships is a biennial international competition in marathon road running for Asian athletes. Organised by the Asian Athletics Association, its creation in 1988 followed decision to drop the 42.195-kilometre (26-mile and 385-yard) race from the programme of events at the Asian Athletics Championships. In that competition, championship marathons were held for men in 1973 and 1975, then finally for both men and women at the 1985.

The first discrete men's and women's Asian championship marathons in 1988 were held at different locations. The men's side was incorporated into that year's Lake Biwa Marathon while the women's side was held within the Nagoya Women's Marathon. The first winners (Masayuki Nishi and Xie Lihua) were not the fastest Asian runners in those races, as only those specifically chosen to represent their nation were eligible to win the Asian title. The following edition in 1990 saw both sexes compete at the same location and again the races were hosted within a major annual marathon race, this time the Seoul International Marathon, where Korean racers Kim Won-Tak and Lee Mi-Ok claimed both the Asian and Seoul titles.

The 1992 Asian Marathon Championships were held in Bandung, Indonesia, outside of a major race for the first time. This was reverted soon after in 1994, when the men's race was contained at the Beppu-Ōita Marathon and the women in Nagoya for a second time. Since then, each occurrence of the championship has been in one location for both sexes alongside a major city marathon. The Pattaya Marathon has hosted the event twice (2000 and 2011), while the Hong Kong Marathon has served as the venue three times (2002, 2008 and 2013).

East Asian runners have been the most successful at the competition, with the Japanese topping the rankings with nine men's titles and four women's titles across the championship's history. China, South Korea and North Korea have each won four titles between the men's and women's races. North Korea's Kim Kum-Ok is the most successful runner in competition history – she is a three-time winner of the women's championship (2006, 2008 and 2013). Kenichi Kawakubo, Mohammed Abduh Bakhet and Zhang Shujing are the only other runners to have won the championship twice.

Editions
First three championships held within Asian Athletics Championships

Medallists

Men

Women

All time medal table (from 1988)

See also
Marathons at the Asian Games

References

External links
Official website of the Asian Athletics Association

Marathons in Asia
Marathon
Marathon
Recurring sporting events established in 1988
Continental athletics championships
Biennial athletics competitions